Sonia Bisset Poll (born April 1, 1971) is a retired Cuban track and field athlete who competed in the javelin throw.

Achievements

External links
Picture of Sonia Bisset

sports-reference

References

1971 births
Living people
People from Santiago de Cuba Province
Cuban female javelin throwers
Athletes (track and field) at the 2000 Summer Olympics
Athletes (track and field) at the 2004 Summer Olympics
Athletes (track and field) at the 2003 Pan American Games
Athletes (track and field) at the 2007 Pan American Games
Olympic athletes of Cuba
World Athletics Championships medalists
Pan American Games medalists in athletics (track and field)
Pan American Games silver medalists for Cuba
Universiade medalists in athletics (track and field)
Goodwill Games medalists in athletics
Central American and Caribbean Games gold medalists for Cuba
Competitors at the 1998 Central American and Caribbean Games
Competitors at the 2006 Central American and Caribbean Games
Universiade silver medalists for Cuba
Central American and Caribbean Games medalists in athletics
Medalists at the 1997 Summer Universiade
Competitors at the 1998 Goodwill Games
Medalists at the 2007 Pan American Games
20th-century Cuban women
20th-century Cuban people
21st-century Cuban women